La Manche Mines was a settlement in Newfoundland and Labrador.  It was located southeast of Arnold's Cove and near to Rantem.  It last recorded a population in the mid-20th century, the total being 1 (one).

This is a former mine site that was abandoned many years ago. It is not a populated community.

Populated places in Newfoundland and Labrador